Live at the Ritz is a 1988 live album by The Gunslingers (Ronnie Wood & Bo Diddley). It was a chart hit in Japan, peaking at #40 and selling over 11,000 copies.

It was recorded live at the Ritz, New York, in November 1987.

Track listing 
 "Road Runner" (Ellas McDaniel) - 3:25
 "I’m a Man" (Ellas McDaniel) - 7:10
 "Crackin’ Up" (Ellas McDaniel) - 8:37
 "Hey! Bo Diddley" (Ellas McDaniel) - 2:47
 "Plynth (Water Down the Drain)" (Ron Wood, Rod Stewart) - 5:01
 "Ooh La La" (Ron Wood, Ronnie Lane) - 3:54
 "Outlaws" (Ron Wood, Jim Ford) - 4:12
 "Honky Tonk Women" (Mick Jagger, Keith Richards) - 4:02
 "Money to Ronnie" (Ellas McDaniel) - 4:33
 "Who Do You Love?" (Ellas McDaniel) - 7:48

Personnel 

Ronnie Wood - vocals, guitar
Bo Diddley - vocals, guitar, drums
Jim Satten - guitar
Hal Goldstein - harmonica, drums, keyboards, vocals
Eddie Kendricks - harmonica, keyboards, vocals
Debby Hastings - bass, vocals
Mike Fink - drums
David Ruffin - vocals
Sarah Dash - vocals
Faith Fusillo - vocals
Carol MacDonald - vocals

References

Ronnie Wood albums
Bo Diddley albums
1988 live albums
Collaborative albums